Radical 6 or radical hook meaning "hook" is one of 6 of the 214  Kangxi radicals that are composed of only one stroke.

In the Kangxi Dictionary, there are 19 characters (out of 49,030) to be found under this radical.

In Simplified Chinese, this radical is merged to Radical 2 . However, it is often omitted in mainstream dictionaries, including Xiandai Hanyu Cidian.

Evolution

Derived characters

Literature

External links

Unihan Database - U+4E85

006